Leon Katz may refer to:

Leon Katz (biomedical engineer) (1924–2015)
Leon Katz (physicist) (1909–2004)
Leon Katz (playwright) (1919–2017)
Leon A. Katz, member of the New York City Council